Sale City is a town in Mitchell County, Georgia, United States. The population was 354 at the 2020 census.

History
A post office called Sale City was established in 1904. The community was named after founder T.D. Sale. The Georgia General Assembly incorporated Sale City as a town in 1910.

Geography
Sale City is located in eastern Mitchell County at  (31.262970, -84.022182). Georgia State Route 93 passes through the town center, leading southwest  to Pelham and northwest  to Baconton.

Demographics

2020 census

As of the 2020 United States census, there were 354 people, 173 households, and 124 families residing in the city.

2000 census
As of the census of 2000, there were 319 people, 125 households, and 98 families residing in the town. The racial makeup of the town was 89.97% White and 10.03% African American. Hispanic or Latino of any race were 0.94% of the population.

There were 125 households, out of which 32.8% had children under the age of 18 living with them, 61.6% were married couples living together, 12.0% had a female householder with no husband present, and 21.6% were non-families. 20.0% of all households were made up of individuals, and 8.8% had someone living alone who was 65 years of age or older.  The average household size was 2.55 and the average family size was 2.86.

In the town, the population was spread out, with 24.8% under the age of 18, 9.7% from 18 to 24, 28.8% from 25 to 44, 21.0% from 45 to 64, and 15.7% who were 65 years of age or older.  The median age was 36 years. For every 100 females, there were 101.9 males.  For every 100 females age 18 and over, there were 93.5 males.

The median income for a household in the town was $33,542, and the median income for a family was $37,778. Males had a median income of $30,625 versus $19,306 for females. The per capita income for the town was $16,971.  About 10.8% of families and 10.7% of the population were below the poverty line, including 12.2% of those under age 18 and 12.3% of those age 65 or over.

References

Towns in Mitchell County, Georgia
Towns in Georgia (U.S. state)